The Book of Fate is a 2006 novel written by Brad Meltzer. In it, a 200-year-old code invented by Thomas Jefferson reveals a modern-day conspiracy that involves the power brokers of Washington, D.C and the elite of Palm Beach society. According to WorldCat, the book is in 2,281 libraries.

Plot synopsis 
On a July 4th weekend, US President Wes Holloway attends an event. As the president is leaving, a crazed assassin attacks. The assassin kills one of the president's aides and best friends, Ron Boyle, and permanently disfigures Holloway with a bullet to the face. Eight years later, Boyle turns up alive. In trying to figure out how and why Boyle has returned, Wes must piece together clues involving that July 4th, a decades-old presidential crossword puzzle, ancient Masonic symbols hidden in the street plan of Washington, D.C., and ultimately a 200-year-old code invented by Thomas Jefferson.

References

External links 
 http://bradmeltzer.com/book/the-book-of-fate/

2006 American novels
Books by Brad Meltzer